Vojkovice is a municipality and village in the Frýdek-Místek District in the Moravian-Silesian Region of the Czech Republic. It has about 800 inhabitants.

Geography
Vojkovice lies in the Moravian-Silesian Foothills, in the historical region of Cieszyn Silesia.

History
Vojkovice was founded around 1500, certainly before 1520. The first written mention is from 1573, when it was part of Frýdek state country. The inhabitants subsisted mainly on weaving, agriculture and hauling merchant carts up the hills.

After World War I and fall of Austria-Hungary it became a part of Czechoslovakia. In March 1939 it became a part of Protectorate of Bohemia and Moravia. After World War II it was restored to Czechoslovakia.

Notable people
Lubomír Pokluda (born 1958), footballer

References

External links

 

Villages in Frýdek-Místek District
Cieszyn Silesia